Mai Văn Chung, stagename Văn Chung, (Hải Dương, 1914-1984) was a Vietnamese singer-songwriter.  He was a posthumous recipient of the Hồ Chí Minh Prize in 2007.

References 

People from Hải Dương province
Vietnamese composers
1914 births
1984 deaths
Ho Chi Minh Prize recipients
20th-century composers